Den Nya Politiken ("The New Politics") was a communist daily newspaper published in Stockholm, Sweden from August 1924 to November 1925. Zeth Höglund was the editor of the paper. The paper functioned as the organ of the dissident Communist Party of Sweden led by Höglund.

References

1924 establishments in Sweden
1925 disestablishments in Sweden
Communist newspapers published in Sweden
Defunct newspapers published in Sweden
Newspapers established in 1924
Newspapers published in Stockholm
Publications disestablished in 1925
Swedish-language newspapers